Florestan (Tancrède Florestan Roger Louis Grimaldi; 10 October 1785, in Paris – 20 June 1856) was Prince of Monaco and Duke of Valentinois from 2 October 1841 until his death. He was the second son of Prince Honoré IV and Louise d'Aumont Mazarin and succeeded to the throne on the death of his brother, Honoré V.

Early life, education, and military career
Brought up by his mother, he showed an early and strong aptitude for literature. At the age of eleven, he enrolled in the School of Fontainebleau, but did not stay there long. He entered the military, where he had many struggles and barely achieved the rank of Corporal. He was taken prisoner during the French invasion of Russia. He was not freed to return to France until 1814.

Marriage and children

Prince Florestan, age 29, married Maria Caroline Gibert de Lametz in Commercy on 27 November 1816. Apparently, his family disapproved of the union, so they had to marry "quietly and modestly." Florestan received only a small income from his family, so, as it turned out, his marriage to an upper-bourgeois family member of the province of Champagne was, in fact, "financially favorable."

The marriage produced the following:
 Charles III, Prince of Monaco (1818–1889)
 Princess Florestine of Monaco (1833–1897)

Reign 

Florestan was ill-prepared to assume the role of Sovereign Prince. Indeed, the British historian H. Pemberton wrote that, upon accession to the throne, Florestan was "a man utterly unsuited for the task before him." He had been an actor in the Théâtre de l'Ambigu-Comique. The real power during his reign lay in the hands of his wife, Princess Caroline, who possessed great intelligence and "excelled at social skills." According to the historian Gustave Saige, Princess Caroline's intelligence was required to figure out the affairs of state, which Honoré V had handled absolutely by himself, not trusting anyone to advise or assist him. For some time, she was able, by tax reform, to alleviate the difficult economic situation stemming from the Congress of Vienna assigning Monaco as a protectorate of the Kingdom of Sardinia rather than France. At the time Monaco was surrounded by the Sardinian controlled County of Nice.

As unprepared as Florestan was for the affairs of the Principality, his ascendance to power upon the death of his brother was largely welcomed by the populace. "He was given a particularly warm reception by the people of Menton," wrote Saige in French. Saige attributed the cause for this to the relief widely felt at having a prince who was not invisible to the public; unlike Honoré V, Florestan went out in public. He even established a school in Menton, albeit an expensive one from which the princely couple attempted to meet local demands for democratic reforms and offered two constitutions to the local population, but these were rejected, particularly by the people of Menton, who were offered something better by King Charles Albert of Sardinia. When the Prince and Princess of Monaco saw that their efforts were doomed to failure, they handed over power to their son Charles (later Prince Charles III). This was, however, too little, too late. Encouraged by the French Revolution of 1848, the towns of Menton and Roquebrune revolted and declared themselves independent. Worse, the King of Sardinia garrisoned Menton, Florestan was dethroned, arrested, and imprisoned. Florestan was restored to the throne in 1849, but Menton and Roquebrune were lost forever.

Death and succession, 1856

Despite his good intentions, by the time of Florestan's death in Paris in 1856, Monaco was a country divided with few prospects for financial prosperity. His son Charles succeeded him.

Ancestry

References

1785 births
1856 deaths
19th-century Princes of Monaco
House of Grimaldi
Monegasque princes
Princes of Monaco
Hereditary Princes of Monaco
Burials at the Cathedral of Our Lady Immaculate
Monegasque people of Italian descent
Monegasque male actors
People of Ligurian descent
Marquesses of Baux
Dukes of Valentinois
Monarchs taken prisoner in wartime
French military personnel of the Napoleonic Wars
Dukes of Mayenne